Dave D'Mello (born as David Anthony Fisher on 13 June 1970 in Sidcup, Kent, England) is a British dance music DJ and record producer from Greenhithe, United Kingdom whom started life as a professional / semi professional footballer and was infamously banned for life. As a DJ, he is known for playing dirty, funky house music and often blends elements of funk, rock, and old school. He is also the owner of Vines Vinyl Records and the sister label VVR2.

Early football career
D'Mello was a forward/midfielder who started out as a Gillingham youth team player and signed a professional contract with West Ham United only to have it terminated within a month after being sent off in a friendly.
Gained a wealth of Football Conference, Isthmian League and Southern Football League experience with the likes of Erith & Belvedere, Fisher Athletic, Egham Town, Rainham Town, Sittingbourne, Maidstone United, St. Leonards, Clapton, and Purfleet. He also played in the Spanish Fourth Division for Torrevieja. Was banned for life for an incident during a game whilst at Egham Town when the match was abandoned midway through the game. Was released from the Sine Die ban in 2005 at the age of 35 and briefly joined Biggleswade Town in the South Midlands Premier and captained them to a successful season.

Dave is now a UEFA B football coach who runs the Football 1st Academy and scouts for various professional football clubs.

DJ and producing career
Began DJing back in the early 1990s and has had residencies at Pacha, Revolution and ACTV in Spain, The Play Room, Dolce and The Gardening Club in London and Mu Mu's in his hometown of Maidstone. In 2005 Dave set up the independent dance music label Vines Vinyl Records purely for his own experimental hard house sounds, but quickly began signing more vocal based artists to the label. The label has grown considerably in recent years with many artists signed and has now launched a sister label called VVR2 with a totally different direction away from dance music with the signing of many Britain's Got Talent finalists, indie rock bands, and commercial pop stars. In September 2009, D'Mello signed Hollie Steel to his record label VVR2, where she began recording her debut single "Where Are You, Christmas?" from the American film Dr. Seuss' How the Grinch Stole Christmas. The single was released on 14 December 2009.

Tracks from his Innocent Insight album were used in hit U.S. television series FlashForward, which aired for one season on ABC between September 24, 2009, and May 27, 2010.

He has also remixed tracks for mainstream artist's such as MIA, BT, Kadoc, worked with D:Ream on their single "Gods in the Making" and in July 2010 released a collaboration with Jan Johnston called "Remember". Dave has just finished producing a dance album with former CBeebies television presenter Sarah-Jane Honeywell which is due to be released April 2012.

D'Mello was arrested on the 13 August 2011 accused of failing to supply dozens of tickets for that years V Festival, but was found not guilty on all charges at Maidstone Crown Court, on 26 September 2012, when the prosecution offered no evidence.

Discography

Singles

Dave Fisher

2007 Vines Vinyl Records Dancin With You
2007 Vines Vinyl Records The EP
2008 Vines Vinyl Records Exposition Minimale
2008 Vines Vinyl Records In Love

Dave D'Mello

2009 Vines Vinyl Records Majestic
2009 Vines Vinyl Records When We Touch
2009 Vines Vinyl Records Say You Love Me Ft. Tara Verloop
2009 Vines Vinyl Records The Phoenix
2009 Vines Vinyl Records Now Boy Ft. Kaiya
2009 Vines Vinyl Records Tell Me Ft. Tara Verloop
2009 Vines Vinyl Records Supreme Being
2009 Vines Vinyl Records Fast Cars Ft. Kaiya
2010 Vines Vinyl Records I Am Not A Toy
2010 Vines Vinyl Records Remember Ft. Jan Johnston
2011 Vines Vinyl Records Going Crazy
2011 Vines Vinyl Records From Russia With Love
2011 Vines Vinyl Records Fucking Big Hole
2011 Vines Vinyl Records Just Too Bad
2011 Vines Vinyl Records Supreme Being II
2013 Vines Vinyl Records Naughty By Nature
2013 VVR2 Sharper Than A Heart Attack
2014 VVR2 Wintertime
2014 VVR2 Delinquent
2015 VVR2 Supreme Being III: Heavenly Bodies
2015 VVR2 Smokin
2015 VVR2 Heart of Asia
2015 VVR2 Neon Dreams
2017 Electric Boogaloo Records Another Chance
2019 Electric Boogaloo Records Moments in Death
2019 Electric Boogaloo Records Rain
2020 Electric Boogaloo Records Crazy
2020 Electric Boogaloo Records Your Love
2020 Electric Boogaloo Records She's A Trap
2020 Electric Boogaloo Records Don't Go
2020 Electric Boogaloo Records Won't You Stay
2021 Electric Boogaloo Records The Reason
2021 Electric Boogaloo Records Everybody Rocks
2021 Electric Boogaloo Records Something Between Us

Albums

Dave D'Mello

2009 Vines Vinyl Records Innocent Insight
2014 VVR2 The Definitive D'Mello: Dreams, Demons & Dares
2020 Electric Boogaloo Records Delight

References

External links
Official Dave D'Mello
Spotify
iTunes
Instagram
Facebook
Soundcloud

British DJs
1970 births
Living people
Club DJs
British radio DJs
British dance musicians
People from Maidstone
People from Sidcup
Erith & Belvedere F.C. players
Fisher Athletic F.C. players
CD Torrevieja players
Egham Town F.C. players
Rainham Town F.C. players
Sittingbourne F.C. players
Maidstone United F.C. players
St. Leonards F.C. players
Clapton F.C. players
Thurrock F.C. players
Biggleswade Town F.C. players
Association footballers not categorized by position
English footballers
Electronic dance music DJs
People from Greenhithe